NECA/WizKids, LLC, or simply WizKids, is an American company based in New Jersey that produces tabletop games. WizKids is best known for its collectible miniatures games (CMGs) Mage Knight, HeroClix, MechWarrior, and HorrorClix, all of which make use of the company's Clix system, in which the changing combat statistics and abilities of each figure were indicated by a turnable dial inside the base underneath the figure. The company was founded in 2000 by Jordan Weisman, a veteran of the game company FASA. It was purchased by sports-card manufacturer Topps, Inc. in 2003.

WizKids was acquired by NECA in September 2009.

History

WizKids was founded in 2000 by Jordan Weisman, previously of FASA, to publish Mage Knight. Mage Knight was the first collectible miniatures game. Early employees joining Jordan in this endeavor were his wife Dawne, who led the company's graphic design; his father Mort, who ran international sales; his brother-in-law Ray Wehrs, who ran domestic sales; and Jenny (Trisko) Berg, previously of Bungie, who was in charge of marketing.

In 2001 the company went from being "virtual" to having its own office in Bellevue, Washington. Employees had previously been spread through Washington, Illinois, and Missouri. Mage Knight was selling as fast as it could be made, and the company moved into the hobby's list of 10 largest publishers. The employee count went up to over 30, including Don Gorski, COO; Tom Virgin, CFO; Martin A. Stever, Executive V.P; and Marc Sachnoff, President of WizKids Licensing and Media, who made the innovative deals bringing together the Marvel and DC comics character universes into the HeroClix line.

Though they proved less successful, WizKids also produced the short-lived CMGs Crimson Skies, Shadowrun Duels, and Creepy Freaks, as well as a baseball-themed CMG called MLB SportsClix. A CMG called ToonClix was announced in March 2006, but canceled before it was released.

In July 2004, WizKids created a new product category with the release of their first constructible strategy game (or CSG), Pirates of the Spanish Main, featuring miniature ships assembled from pieces punched out of styrene cards. Their next CSG was a science fiction game called Rocketmen, released in the summer of 2005, followed by a NASCAR CSG called RaceDay later that year, though these last two games were discontinued shortly after. By 2007, WizKids was also calling some of their releases involving CSG elements "PocketModel" games, beginning with the Star Wars PocketModel game.

In 2005, WizKids released their first collectible card game, High Stakes Drifter, which was discontinued after its initial set. In May 2006, they released their second CCG, a licensed game based on the reimagined Battlestar Galactica TV series.

WizKids entered the board game market with a board game called Tsuro in 2005, followed in 2006 by Oshi and Pirates: Quest For Davy Jones' Gold, a board game based on the Pirates constructible strategy game.

The company also owned the rights to the role-playing games Shadowrun and Classic Battletech, which they licensed to FanPro in 2001. A game created by the company called Zypods, with a physical structure similar to Matryoshka dolls, had a limited release, but was never distributed nationwide.

The Topps Company announced on November 10, 2008, that it intended to close WizKids and discontinue product lines including HeroClix. In the statement announcing the close of WizKids, Topps also indicated that it was pursuing alternatives to discontinuing brands so that brands such as HeroClix could continue on without any noticeable disruption in future product offerings.

Sale to NECA
At the July 2009 San Diego Comic-Con, National Entertainment Collectibles Association (NECA) displayed a Thor figure for Heroclix, indicating that they might be the new parent company for WizKids. On September 14, 2009, NECA announced that they had purchased the assets of WizKids from The Topps Company and will continue the HeroClix family of games under the WizKids brand. The WizKids assets sold did not include Shadowrun and Battletech, which were retained by Topps Inc.

The "Buy It By the Brick" retail promotion returned with the Marvel HeroClix: Hammer of Thor set. Unlike previous offerings, the promotional figure (Ragnarok Surtur) was available with the 10-pack brick purchase at retail locations, rather than through mail-in redemption. With the following set DC HeroClix: Brave and the Bold the promotional figure (a Batman and Catwoman duo-figure) returned to redemption through WizKids/NECA, though this time done online.

Storyline Organized Play
Beginning with The Infinity Gauntlet in 2012, WizKids began to implement Storyline Organized Play programs. These programs would let gamers go to their local store once a month to play in an event that built up to a grand finale. Players are typically rewarded for attending multiple events before the finale. Storyline Organized Play themes have included No Man's Land for DC, Fear Itself for Marvel, The Dominion War for Star Trek, and others. WizKids continues to implement tweaks to their Storyline Organized Play programs.

Production
WizKids produces both licensed and first-party games. Many of the games WizKids utilize include patented elements like the Combat Dial System. WizKids produces both physical items, like HeroClix, as well as digital transliterations, like Quarriors! for IOS.

Games and products

Board Games
 Justice League
 Freddy Vs Jason Forest of Fear
 Gremlins
 The Hobbit: An Unexpected Journey
 Mage Knight Board Game
 Oshi
 Pirates: Quest For Davy Jones' Gold
 Sidereal Confluence: Trading and Negotiation in the Elysian Quadrant
 Star Trek: Expeditions
 Star Trek: Frontiers 
 Star Trek: Fleet Captains
 Trains and Stations
 Tsuro* (2004)
 Mage Knight Board Game

Books
 MechWarrior: Dark Age (Novels)
 Mage Knight (Novels and collectors' guides)

Collectible Card Games
 Battlestar Galactica
 High Stakes Drifter

Dice Building Games
Quarriors!
The Lord of the Rings Dice Building Game
Dice Masters
Marvel Dice Masters
Avengers vs X-Men
Uncanny X-Men
Age of Ultron 
The Amazing Spider-Man 
Civil War 
Doctor Strange Team Pack
Deadpool
Iron Man and War Machine
Defenders Team Pack
Guardians of the Galaxy
Spider-man Maximum Carnage
X-Men First Class
The Mighty Thor
Kree Invasion
Avengers Infinity
Justice Like Lightning
X-Men Forever
Uncanny X-Force
DC Comics Dice Masters
Justice League
War of Light
World's Finest (originally Superman/Batman) 
Green Arrow and The Flash
Batman
Superman and Wonder Woman
Harley Quinn Team Pack
Yu-Gi-Oh! Dice Masters
Series 1
Dungeons & Dragons Dice Masters
Battle for Faerûn
 Faerun Under Siege
Tomb of Annihilation
Trouble in Waterdeep Campaign Box
Adventures in Waterdeep Team Pack
The Zhentarim Team Pack
 Teenage Mutant Ninja Turtles
Teenage Mutant Ninja Turtles Dice Masters
TMNT Dice Masters: Heroes in a Half Shell
WWE Dice Masters
WWE Dice Masters: Campaign Box
WWE Dice Masters: Bitter Rivals Team Pack
WWE Dice Masters: Tag Teams Team Pack

Collectible miniatures games
 Clix games
 Creepy Freaks
 Crimson Skies
 Halo ActionClix
 HeroClix
 DC HeroClix
 Marvel HeroClix
 Indy HeroClix
 The BPRD and Hellboy HeroClix
 City of Heroes HeroClix
 City of Villains HeroClix
 Invincible HeroClix
 Gears of War HeroClix
 Iron Maiden HeroClix
 The Lord of the Rings HeroClix
 Street Fighter HeroClix
 Star Trek HeroClix
 Teenage Mutant Ninja Turtles HeroClix
 Yu-Gi-Oh! HeroClix
 HorrorClix
 Mage Knight
 Mage Knight: Dungeons
 MechWarrior
 MechWarrior: Dark Age
 MechWarrior: Age of Destruction
 Shadowrun Duels
 SportsClix
 Star Trek: Attack Wing
 MLB SportsClix
 Zypods

Constructible Strategy Games
 Pirates Constructible Strategy Game
 Rocketmen
 NASCAR Race Day
 The Lord of the Rings CSG  (Unreleased)

Pocketmodel Games
 Star Wars PocketModel Trading Card Game
 Pirates of the Caribbean PocketModels

Awards

Board Game Geek
2012 Golden Geek Best Thematic Game: Mage Knight Board Game

Diamond Comic Distributors Gem Award
2010 Game Product of the Year for DC HeroClix Blackest Night Starter Set

Origins Awards
2010 Best Miniature Figure or Line of Miniature Figures of the Year for Marvel HeroClix Hammer of Thor Expansion
2011 Best Miniatures Game Rules of the Year for DC HeroClix Blackest Night Starter Game
2013 Best Miniature Figure Line of the Year for Marvel HeroClix: Galactic Guardians
2013 Best Family, Party, or Children’s Game of the Year for Quarriors! Dice Building Game
2013 Best Miniature Rules of the Year for The Hobbit: An Unexpected Journey – Campaign Starter Set
2016 Best Collectible Game for DC Comics Dice Masters: War of Light by Mike Elliot and Eric M. Lang

References

External links
 

Game manufacturers
Companies based in New Jersey
Companies established in 2000
Privately held companies based in New Jersey
Gaming miniatures companies